The Saddest Boy in the World is a Canadian short black comedy film, directed by Jamie Travis and released in 2006. The film stars Benjamin Smith as Timothy Higgins, a lonely and unhappy young boy who plans to commit suicide by hanging himself on his birthday.

It was the second film in his Saddest Children in the World trilogy, following Why the Anderson Children Didn't Come to Dinner and preceding The Armoire.

The film had its theatrical premiere at the 2006 Toronto International Film Festival. It was later screened at the 2007 Inside Out Film and Video Festival, where it was cowinner with Michèle Pearson Clarke's Black Men and Me of the award for Best Canadian Short Film.

References

External links

2009 films
Canadian black comedy films
Canadian LGBT-related short films
LGBT-related black comedy films
LGBT-related comedy films
2006 LGBT-related films
2006 films
Films directed by Jamie Travis
2000s English-language films
Canadian drama short films
Canadian comedy short films
2000s Canadian films